Acraga luteola is a moth of the family Dalceridae. It is found in northern Brazil (Amazon Basin). The habitat probably consists of tropical moist forests.

The length of the forewings is about 22 mm. Adults are yellow ochre, but the forewings golden yellow, the basal halves of the inner margin and the costal margin bright yellow ochre. The hindwings are paler, but darker yellow at the anal angle.

References

Dalceridae
Moths described in 1921